The José Finkel Trophy is a Brazilian competition played by teams in individual and relay swimming events. It is also known as the Brazilian Open Winter Championship and / or the Brazilian Open Short Course Pool Championship, despite being sporadically played in the Long Course Pool. It is one of the most notable events nationwide.

Its first edition took place in 1972 in Curitiba and had Botafogo de Futebol e Regatas as champion. The most recent edition took place in the city of Curitiba in September 2019. The trophy is marked by the hegemony of the clubs in the states of Rio de Janeiro, São Paulo and Minas Gerais. Its name is a tribute to the promising swimmer from Paraná, José Finkel, who died in 1971 as a result of cancer.

Trophy history 
After José Finkel's death, Berek Krieger, then president of the Paraná Aquatics Sports Federation (FDAP) decided to create a competition in the winter, thus filling a hole in the national swimming calendar. The creation of the event would also be a way to improve the mood of swimming in Paraná, which had been greatly reduced by the death of the young swimmer. Finkel started treatment and disappeared, probably saved by the family, of the taboos related to this disease, then in effect. A few weeks later, Finkel died. The team he was part of, Centro Israelita, could not bear the loss, and after Finkel's death no one trained anymore.

About José Finkel 
José Finkel was an athlete born in 1954. In 1968, he helped the Curitiba team to be the winner of men's swimming in the 12th Paraná Open Games. In October 1970, the small swimming team, Centro Israelita, traveled to a competition at Grêmio Náutico União, in Porto Alegre. The state of Paraná was, then, weak in this sport. He had never produced a swimmer of national prominence. José Finkel, still 17 years old, was already considered the best "Breastroker" of the team. In one of the training sessions for the competition, Finkel started to feel bad. When the team returned to Curitiba, he faced the medical exams and his clinical picture pointed to cancer in the lymphatic vessels.

Champion by Year

Meet records

Long course (50 m)

Men

Women

Short course (25 m)

Men

Women

References 

Swimming competitions in Brazil